Club verde is a 1945 Mexican musical drama film directed by Raphael J. Sevilla. It stars Emilio Tuero, Emilia Guiú, and Celia Montalván.

References

External links
 

1945 films
1940s musical drama films
Mexican black-and-white films
Mexican musical drama films
1945 drama films
Films directed by Raphael J. Sevilla
1940s Mexican films